Fontana may refer to:

Places

Italy
Fontana Liri, comune in the Province of Frosinone
Fontanafredda, comune in the Province of Pordenone
Fontanarosa, comune in the Province of Avellino
Francavilla Fontana, comune in the Province of Brindisi
Serrara Fontana, comune in the Province of Napoli

Switzerland
Fontana GR, a settlement in Tarasp in the Canton of Graubünden
Fontana (Airolo), a settlement in Airolo, in the Canton of Ticino

United States
Fontana, California
Fontana, Kansas
Fontana, Texas
Fontana Village, North Carolina
Fontana-on-Geneva Lake, Wisconsin
Fontana Dam in the U.S. state of North Carolina

Elsewhere
Fontana, Chaco, a settlement in San Fernando Department, Chaco Province, Argentina
Fontana, Gozo, on Gozo Island, Republic of Malta
Fontana (Belgrade), a neighborhood of Belgrade, Serbia
Fontana (lunar crater), an impact crater on the Moon
Fontana (Martian crater), an impact craters on Mars
Fontana metro station, a rapid transit station in Barcelona, Catalonia, Spain
Fontana station (California), a commuter rail station in Fontana, California, USA

Other uses
Fontana (surname)
Fontana (Schooner), a schooner that wrecked in the St. Clair River
Fontana Books or Fontana Press, an imprint of HarperCollins
Fontana Distribution, a record distribution company
Fontana North, a Canadian record distribution company
Fontana Records, a record label
Fontana (drag queen), Brazilian-Swedish drag queen

See also